Kihansi Hydroelectric Power Station, is a  hydroelectric power station located in  Kilombero District of southeast Morogoro Region in southern Tanzania. The power station is one of the largest dams in the country. The Tanzanian electricity company, Tanesco operates the power station on behalf of the government of Tanzania.

Location
The geographical coordinates of the power station are:08°34'30.0"S, 35°51'05.0"E (Latitude:-8.575000; Longitude:35.851389).

Overview
The Kihansi Dam is a concrete gravity dam owned by the Tanzania Electric Supply Company Limited. Its construction began in July 1995 and was opened by President Benjamin W. Mkapa on 10 July 2000. It cost $275 million to construct. Its installed capacity is 180 megawatts and it provided approximately 13 percent of the total electrical power in Tanzania, at the time it was commissioned.

Technical details

Environmental impact
The Kihansi Dam destroyed an 800m-high waterfall, affected over 20,000 villagers, and was directly responsible for the extinction in the wild of the Kihansi Spray Toad. The dam reduced the amount of silt and water coming down from the waterfall into the gorge by 90 percent. This led to the spray toad's microhabitat being compromised, as it reduced the amount of water spray, which the toads were directly reliant on for oxygen. This also meant that the toad may have been more susceptible to a chytrid fungus, which was believed to have been transported to the area by conservationists' boots. This chytridiomycosis, which in 2003 was confirmed to be in dead animals of the species, was possibly responsible for the sudden population crash after the world's largest sprinkler system was installed in that area in August 2003. This system was installed to try and conserve the toad species from becoming extinct in the wild, but did not succeed.

See also

List of hydropower stations in Africa
List of power stations in Tanzania

References

External links
Tanesco Official Website

Dams completed in 2000
Energy infrastructure completed in 2000
Dams in Tanzania
Hydroelectric power stations in Tanzania
Buildings and structures in the Morogoro Region